Miriam Dalmazio (born 14 September 1987) is an Italian actress.

Early life and career 
Born in Palermo in the Noce neighbourhood, she graduated at Centro sperimentale di cinematografia in Rome and started acting in the soap opera Agrodolce.

After taking part in the cast of some television productions, she gets the first role of a certain importance in the fiction Che Dio ci aiuti, where she plays - in the first, second and third season - the shy and awkward doctor Margherita Morbidelli, a girl from the province who moved in the boarding school run by Sister Angela for study reasons.
She appeared with Checco Zalone in a 2013 Italian comedy film Sole a catinelle directed by Gennaro Nunziante, the second highest-grossing Italian film in Italy.

Selected filmography

TV series

References

External links

1987 births
Living people
Italian film actresses
Actresses from Palermo
Italian stage actresses
Italian television actresses
People from Palermo
Mass media people from Sicily